Erin Teresa McDonald (born 25 November 1980) is a New Zealand former cricketer who played as a slow left-arm orthodox bowler. She appeared in three Women's One Day International matches for New Zealand in 2000, and was part of New Zealand's squad for the 2000 Women's Cricket World Cup. Following her playing career, McDonald worked for Aurecon in Melbourne, Australia, and worked on the design of an underground rail line.

References

External links
 

1980 births
Living people
New Zealand women cricketers
New Zealand women One Day International cricketers
Cricketers from Lower Hutt
Central Districts Hinds cricketers
Wellington Blaze cricketers